Bono (born Paul David Hewson in 1960) is an Irish musician, activist, and lead singer for the band U2.

Bono may also refer to:
 Bono people, an Akan ethnic group of Ghana and Ivory Coast
 Bono dialect, spoken by them
 Bono state, an Akan state that existed from the 11th to the 18th centuries in what is now the Brong-Ahafo (Bono, Bono East and Ahafo) region of Ghana

People

As a surname
Alain Bono (born 1983), Cameroonian football player
Alex Bono (born 1994), an American football goalkeeper
Chaz Bono (born Chastity Bono in 1969), activist, writer, actor, musician and son of Sonny Bono and Cher
Edward de Bono (1933–2021), Maltese-British physician, writer, and consultant
Emilio De Bono (1866–1944), Italian general
José Bono (born 1950), Spanish politician, former president of Castile-La Mancha, minister of defence and President of the Congress of Deputies
Ken Bono (born 1984), Philippine basketball player
Laura Bono (born 1979), Italian singer
Mary Bono Mack (born 1961), politician, second wife of Sonny Bono, and current wife of Connie Mack IV
Matteo Bono (born 1983), Italian cyclist
Outel Bono (died 26 August 1973), Chadian medical doctor and politician, murdered in Paris
Sonny Bono (1935–1998), American record producer, singer, actor, and politician
Steve Bono (born 1962), former National Football League quarterback
Vincenza Bono Parrino (born 1942), Italian politician

As a nickname
Peter Bonnington (born 1985), Formula One engineer
Yassine Bounou (born 1991), Moroccan football player

Places

United States
Bono, Arkansas, United States
Bono, Ohio, United States
Bono, Lawrence County, Indiana, United States
Bono Township, Lawrence County, Indiana, United States
Bono, Vermillion County, Indiana, United States
Bono, Texas, United States

Elsewhere
Bono region, a region within Ghana
Bono East region, a region within Ghana
Bono Manso, a former ancient trading town of the Brong-Ahafo region of Ghana
Bono, Italy, Sardinia
Bono, Morbihan, a commune in the Morbihan department in France
Bono, Indonesia, a village in Tulung, Klaten Regency, Central Java, Indonesia
Bono, Norway, a small country village in Norway built in the 16th century

Other uses
Bono Act, the Copyright Term Extension Act (United States), named for Sonny Bono
Bonobono, a Japanese manga series by Mikio Igarashi
Pro bono, a legal term